Central Depository Company of Pakistan (CDC) is a Pakistani central securities depository company which provides services for equity, debt and other financial instruments.

It was founded in 1993 and is based in Karachi, Pakistan. The current CEO is Badiuddin Akber.

CDC is regulated by the Securities and Exchange Commission of Pakistan.

References

Pakistan Stock Exchange
Companies based in Karachi
Central securities depositories
Financial services companies established in 1993
Pakistani companies established in 1993